Club Deportivo Universidad Técnica del Estado was a Chilean association football club linked to the Technical University of the State of Chile (current University of Santiago, Chile).

It was founded on 1948 and disappeared in 1969.

Club facts
Record Segunda División victory — 6–0 v. Santiago National (1955), 6–0 v. Trasandino (1969)
Record Segunda División defeat — 0–7 v. San Luis de Quillota (1958)
Segunda División Best Position  — 4th (1962)
Segunda División Worst Position  — 12th (1965)

References

External links
 RSSSF 1954
 RSSSF 1955
 RSSSF 1956
 RSSSF 1957
 RSSSF 1958
 RSSSF 1959
 RSSSF 1960
 RSSSF 1961
 RSSSF 1962
 RSSSF 1963
 RSSSF 1964
 RSSSF 1965
 RSSSF 1966
 RSSSF 1967
 RSSSF 1968
 RSSSF 1969

Defunct football clubs in Chile
Association football clubs established in 1947
Association football clubs disestablished in 1969
1947 establishments in Chile
1969 disestablishments in Chile